Amaranthus retroflexus is a species of flowering plant in the family Amaranthaceae with several common names, including red-root amaranth, redroot pigweed, red-rooted pigweed, common amaranth, pigweed amaranth, and common tumbleweed.

Description 
Amaranthus retroflexus, true to one of its common names, forms a tumbleweed. It is native to the tropical Americas, but is widespread as an introduced species on most continents in a great number of habitats. This is an erect, annual herb reaching a maximum height near . The plant is monoecious, with individuals bearing both male and female flowers. The inflorescence is a large, dense cluster of flowers interspersed with spiny green bracts. Another of A. retroflexus's common names is "pigweed" because it grows where hogs are pasture-fed.

Culinary use 

This plant is eaten as a vegetable in different places of the world. No species of genus Amaranthus is known to be poisonous, but the leaves contain oxalic acid and may contain nitrates if grown in nitrate-rich soils, so the water should be discarded after boiling. The young shoots and leaves can be eaten raw. The leaves are high in calcium, iron, protein, and phosphorus.

A. retroflexus was used for a multitude of food and medicinal purposes by many Native American groups in the US West.  It is among the species consumed as a vegetable in Mexican markets as Quelite quintonil.

It is used in the Indian state of Kerala to prepare a popular dish known as thoran by combining the finely cut leaves with grated coconut, chili peppers, garlic, turmeric and other ingredients.

The seeds are edible raw or toasted, and can be ground into flour and used for bread, hot cereal, or as a thickener.

Use as fodder 
Like many other species of Amaranthus,  this plant may be harmful and even deadly when fed to cattle and pigs in large amounts over several days. Such forage may cause fatal nephrotoxicity, presumably because of its high oxalate content. Other symptoms, such as bloat or methylglobineamia in the most severe cases, might reflect its high nitrate content. However, when supplied in moderation, it is regarded as an exceptionally nutritious fodder.

As a weed
A. retroflexus is a weed and has developed resistance against fomesafen in Northeast China.

References

External links 

 
 Jepson Manual Treatment
 
 Amaranthus retroflexus L. Medicinal Plant Images Database (School of Chinese Medicine, Hong Kong Baptist University)  
 

retroflexus
Flora of North America
Flora of South America
Plants described in 1753
Taxa named by Carl Linnaeus
Kerala cuisine
Plants used in Native American cuisine
Invasive plant species in Japan